Chiaka Sylvia Ogbogu (born April 15, 1995) is an American volleyball player. She plays for VakıfBank S.K. and the United States women's volleyball team. She participated in the 2018 Pan American Cup and the 2018 and 2019 FIVB Volleyball Women's Nations League.

Ogbogu led Coppell High School to two straight volleyball Texas state championships in 2011 and 2012 and then played for University of Texas at Austin.
On a club level, she started her professional career for Il Bisonte Firenze She is currently playing for the Turkish club VakifBank.

On June 7, 2021, US National Team head coach Karch Kiraly announced she would be part of the 12-player Olympic roster for the 2020 Summer Olympics in Tokyo. She won the Olympic gold medal with her team.

Clubs
  Il Bisonte Firenze (2017–2018)
  KPS Chemik Police (2018–2019)
  Imoco Volley Conegliano (2019–2020)
  Eczacıbaşı VitrA  (2020–2021)
  VakıfBank (2021–)

Awards

Individual
 2022 FIVB Volleyball Women's Club World Championship - "Best Middle Blocker"

Club
 2018-19 Polish Cup -  Champion, with Chemik Police
 2019 Italian Supercup -  Champion, with Imoco Volley Conegliano
 2019 FIVB Volleyball Women's Club World Championship -  Champion, with Imoco Volley Conegliano
 2019-20 Italian Cup (Coppa Italia) -  Champion, with Imoco Volley Conegliano
 2020 AXA Sigorta Champions Cup (Turkish Super Cup) -  Champion, with Eczacibasi Vitra
 2021–22 CEV Women's Champions League Champion with Vakıfbank
 2022 FIVB Volleyball Women's Club World Championship -  Runner-Up, with VakıfBank S.K.

References

External links 
 Player info Team USA
 FIVB profile

1995 births
Living people
American women's volleyball players
Volleyball players at the 2020 Summer Olympics
American expatriate sportspeople in Germany
Expatriate volleyball players in Germany
Texas Longhorns women's volleyball players
Middle blockers
People from Coppell, Texas
University of Texas alumni
American expatriate sportspeople in Turkey
American expatriate sportspeople in Italy
Olympic gold medalists for the United States in volleyball
Medalists at the 2020 Summer Olympics
VakıfBank S.K. volleyballers
Expatriate volleyball players in Turkey